Zale confusa, the confused zale moth, is an owlet moth in the family Erebidae. The species was first described by James Halliday McDunnough in 1940. It is found in North America.

The MONA or Hodges number for Zale confusa is 8701.

References

 Crabo L, Davis M, Hammond P, Mustelin T, Shepard J (2013). "Five new species and three new subspecies of Erebidae and Noctuidae (Insecta, Lepidoptera) from Northwestern North America, with notes on Chytolita Grote (Erebidae) and Hydraecia Guenée (Noctuidae)". ZooKeys 264: 85-123.
 Lafontaine, J. Donald & Schmidt, B. Christian (2010). "Annotated check list of the Noctuoidea (Insecta, Lepidoptera) of North America north of Mexico". ZooKeys, vol. 40, 1-239.

Further reading

 Arnett, Ross H. (2000). American Insects: A Handbook of the Insects of America North of Mexico. CRC Press.

Omopterini
Moths described in 1940